Chris Nolan (born 1998) is an Irish hurler who plays as a left corner-forward for the Carlow senior team.

Born in Rahanna, County Carlow, Nolan first played competitive hurling at Borris Vocational School. He simultaneously came to prominence at juvenile and underage levels with the Mount Leinster Rangers club, winning four successive minor championship medals. Nolan subsequently played with the Mount Leinster Rangers senior team, winning a county championship medal in 2017.

Nolan made his debut on the inter-county scene when he was selected for the Carlow minor team in 2014. He played for three championship seasons with the minor team, before later joining the Carlow under-21 team. Nolan made his senior debut during the 2017 league.

Career statistics

Honours

Mount Leinster Rangers
Carlow Senior Hurling Championship (4): 2017, 2018, 2020, 2021
Carlow Minor Hurling Championship (4): 2013, 2014, 2015, 2016

References

1998 births
Living people
Mount Leinster Rangers hurlers
Cork inter-county hurlers